Glycyrrhiza aspera, is a plant species in the pea family, Fabaceae, native to Asia and eastern Europe (Steppes in south-east Russia and Kazakhstan; farm sides andr river banks in Gansu, Nei Mongol, Qinghai, Shaanxi and Xinjiang Provinces, China). It is used to make a tea.

References

External links
 
 

aspera
Flora of Asia